Centerton is an unincorporated community in Huron County, Ohio, United States.

History
The first post office in Centerton was established in 1848. Centerton is near the center of Norwich Township, which most likely accounts for the name.

References

Populated places in Huron County, Ohio